Eueides aliphera, the Juliette , is a species of nymphalid butterfly, belonging to Heliconiinae subfamily found in the Neotropical ecozone.

Description
The wings are narrower than in all other species of the genus and the apex of primaries is more straight instead of rounded. The basic colour of the wings is fulvous. The uppersides of the forewings have a narrow black bar and black margins, while the uppersides of the hindwings have fine black veins. The underside is similar to the upperside.

Larvae feed on Passiflora oerstedi, Passiflora vitifolia, and Passiflora auriculata.

Distribution
This species can be found in Central and Southern America, from Mexico, Honduras, and Costa Rica to Brazil.

Habitat

Subspecies
Eueides aliphera aliphera (Brazil)
Eueides aliphera cyllenella Seitz, 1912 (Brazil)
Eueides aliphera gracilis Stichel, 1903 (Honduras, Costa Rica)

References
 Eueides aliphera, Tree of Life
 Eueides aliphera, BioLib.cz
 Eueides aliphera, Markku Savela's Lepidoptera and Some Other Life Forms
 Juliette, Learn about Butterflies

Nymphalidae of South America
Lepidoptera of the Caribbean
Heliconiini
Fauna of Brazil